Ruth Daniela Infarinato Morrizon (born 17 June 1969 in Buenos Aires) is an Argentine actress, TV host and journalist. She has been known as one of the strongest figures in the Latin-American youth audience for being VJ for more than 10 years in MTV Latin America.

She currently lives in Miami, Florida.

Career
Since early 1990s Infarinato was regular host of some MTV Latimoamérica's shows, including Conexión, that was one of MTV's outstanding programs.

References

1969 births
Living people
Actresses from Buenos Aires
Argentine people of Italian descent
Argentine television personalities
Women television personalities
Argentine women journalists